Phul Makauri is a village in Shaheed Bhagat Singh Nagar district of Punjab State, India. The village is administrated by Sarpanch an elected representative of the village.

Demography 
As of 2011, Phul Makauri has a total number of 22 houses and population of 104 of which 50 include are males while 54 are females according to the report published by Census India in 2011. The literacy rate of Phul Makauri is 70.21% lower than the state average of 75.84%. The population of children under the age of 6 years is 10 which is 9.62% of total population of Phul Makauri, and child sex ratio is approximately 1000 as compared to Punjab state average of 846.

Most of the people are from Schedule Caste which constitutes 71.15% of total population in Phul Makauri. The town does not have any Schedule Tribe population so far.

As per the report published by Census India in 2011, 28 people were engaged in work activities out of the total population of Phul Makauri which includes 28 males and 0 females. According to census survey report 2011, 100% workers describe their work as main work and 0% workers are involved in Marginal activity providing livelihood for less than 6 months.

Education 
KC Engineering College and Doaba Khalsa Trust Group Of Institutions are the nearest colleges.

List of schools nearby:
Govt Senior Secondary School, Ladhana Jhikka
Dashmesh Model School, Kahma
Govt High School, Jhander Kalan
Govt Gigh School, Khan Khana
Guru Ram Dass Public School, Cheta

Transport 

See also 
List of villages in India

References

External links 
 Tourism of Punjab
 Census of Punjab
 Locality Based PINCode

Villages in Shaheed Bhagat Singh Nagar district